Frederick I of Isenburg-Covern (German: Friedrich I. von Isenburg-Covern) was the Count of Isenburg-Covern from 1246 until 1272.

1272 deaths
House of Isenburg
Year of birth unknown